Surera is a village in the Dantaramgarh Tehsil, Sikar District of Rajasthan, India. It is famous for a fort established by Thakur Moti singh shekhawat in estimate 1695. And also known for the mytred Jatan Singh Shekhawat in 1962 china war 

It falls within the Jaipur Division.

References

Cities and towns in Sikar district